The Continental is an upcoming miniseries developed by Greg Coolidge, Kirk Ward and Shawn Simmons that serves as a prequel spinoff in the John Wick franchise. Coolidge and Ward will write and serve as showrunners for the series, which will premiere on Peacock.  The first and third episodes will be directed by Albert Hughes, and Mel Gibson is set to star in the show.

Premise 
The Continental tells the background story of how Winston Scott came to his position as proprietor of The Continental hotel in the 1970s and establishes it as a safe haven for assassins where no business may take place.  It explores real-world events, including the Great Garbage Strike and the American Mafia's rise to economic power.

Cast 
 Colin Woodell as Winston Scott
 Mel Gibson as Cormac
 Hubert Point-Du Jour as Miles
 Jessica Allain as Lou
 Mishel Prada as KD
 Nhung Kate as Yen
 Ben Robson as Frankie
 Peter Greene as Uncle Charlie
 Ayomide Adegun as Charon
 Jeremy Bobb as Mayhew
 Katie McGrath as "The Adjudicator"
 Ray McKinnon as Jenkins
 Adam Shapiro as Lemmy
 Mark Musashi as Hansel
 Marina Mazepa as Gretel

Episodes

Production

Development 
While planning the story for John Wick: Chapter 3 – Parabellum in January 2017, Derek Kolstad and Chad Stahelski were also conceiving ideas for a prequel story, suggesting that a prequel would be best told in the form of a television series.  In June 2017, the series was confirmed to be in full development, and the story would be called The Continental, focusing on the hotel that acts as a safe haven for assassins in the John Wick universe.  Lionsgate gave the project an official green-light in January 2018 and planned for the series to air on its Starz network. Initial reports indicated Chris Collins would serve as showrunner.

Stahelski initially planned to direct the first episode of the series and stated that it would serve as an origin story for several of the characters in John Wick.  In April 2021, Kevin Beggs, chairman of Lionsgate Television, said the team wanted to make sure that the series would add to the world-building of the John Wick universe without inhibiting any plans for future films. After hearing multiple pitches from different creative teams, Lionsgate settled on the approach presented by Greg Coolidge, Kirk Ward, and Shawn Simmons; and the format of the show was re-worked into a three, 90-minute episode event series following a young Winston in the 1970s.  Coolidge and Ward were the new showrunners, and Albert Hughes and Charlotte Brändström were hired to direct.

Casting 
In October 2021, the cast members were announced starting with Mel Gibson and followed by the rest of the lead cast including Colin Woodell as the young Winston Scott from the main John Wick films. Additional casting announcements in November 2021 revealed that Peter Greene and Ayomide Adegun would portray younger versions of Uncle Charlie and Charon, respectively, and Jeremy Bobb was cast as a new character named Mayhew. In February 2022, roles were announced for Katie McGrath as "The Adjudicator", Ray McKinnon, Adam Shapiro as Lemmy, as well as Mark Musashi and Marina Mazepa as Hansel and Gretel.

Filming 
Filming started in November 2021 in Budapest, Hungary.

Release 
On August 15, 2022, Starz sold the series to Peacock.

References

External links 
 

John Wick
Television shows filmed in Budapest
Upcoming television series
Peacock (streaming service) original programming
Television series by Lionsgate Television